Dynamism of a Soccer Player is a 1913 Futurist painting by Italian artist Umberto Boccioni (1882–1916). It is held in the Museum of Modern Art in New York.

Analysis
The painting depicts a dematerialized soccer player. The athlete's calf is seen in the center of the painting, and portions of other body parts can be seen around it. Due to its use of vibrant hues divided into sections, the painting gives the impression that rays of light are illuminating the subject. Furthermore, the painting's use of transparent and opaque overlapping shapes exhibits a Cubist influence. Dynamism of a Soccer Player demonstrates the following principle presented in Boccioni's Futurist Painting: Technical Manifesto, that "To paint a human figure you must not paint it; you must render the whole of its surrounding atmosphere...movement and light destroy the materiality of bodies."

References 

Paintings by Umberto Boccioni
Paintings in the collection of the Museum of Modern Art (New York City)
1913 paintings
Sports paintings
Association football culture